The Maha Kali Mandir is a temple situated on the national highway near the Majitha bypass on the Jalandhar-Rajasansi airport road, in the state of Punjab, India. The temple was built by the late Sh. Ramesh Chander Sharma, and is run by the Mahakali Mandir Trust, currently headed by Mr. Ritesh Kumar Sharma, who runs the trust and organises the events.

Religious facilities
The Mandir has temples of Maha Kali, Ram Parivar, Maa Durga, Shri Radha Krishan, Sindori Hanuman Ji, Maa Saraswati, Luxmi Narayan Mandir, and Shiv Parivar. The Mandir has a Chamakari Shivling which changes the colour, and a great Murti of the god Hanuman on the roof.

This temple is the only temple in Amritsar which has Nav Grah Mandirs (Temples of the nine Planets).

The temple celebrates all major Hindu festivals, such as Shivratri, Holi, Janamashtami, Diwali, and Dusshera. Dusshera is celebrated on large scale, with any politicians and religious gurus taking part, and addendance of 15,000 to 20,000 people. The temple trust provides food at all the major festivals.

Charity programmes
Maha Kali Mandir runs various charity programmes, such as an eye checkup every Sunday, a dispensary, and a sewing school for girls. Temple welcomes other charity organisations and will host events without any religion restriction.

Film industry
The temple is becoming famous in the film and music industry, as a lot of religious albums have been shot on the  temple premises.

External links
aerial view on Wikimapia

Buildings and structures in Amritsar
Tourist attractions in Amritsar